Tirrases is a district of the Curridabat canton, in the San José province of Costa Rica.

Toponymy 
The district takes its name of the Tirrá tree (Ulmus mexicana).

History 
The Curridabat canton was founded on 21 August 1929, as the 18th province of San José. With the creation of the canton also was created the district.

Geography 
Tirrases has an area of  km2 and an elevation of  metres.

Demographics 

For the 2011 census, Tirrases had a population of  inhabitants.

Transportation

Road transportation 
The district is covered by the following road routes:
 National Route 210
 National Route 211

Education 
6.98% of the population doesn't have any education. The district has two public schools: the Escuela Centroamérica and Escuela 15 de Agosto.
Tirrases also has a public high school called Colegio Técnico Profesional Uladislao Gámez Solano (Fund 2006).
This high school is located at the Catholic Church of Las Mercedes and had a population of 60 students in 2007.

Health 
The health services are provided by the EBAIS (Equipo Básico de Atención Integral en Salud) located at Hacienda Vieja, 200 north and 25 east from the Liceo de Curridabat.

Security 
As per the official statements domestic violence is the most common security issue, but non-official data shows that drugs and gang warfare are the main problems in this zone.

External links 
Official page of Municipalidad de Curridabat (Spanish)
Information about Curridabat canton (Spanish)

References 

Districts of San José Province
Populated places in San José Province